The 1915 Calgary municipal election took place on December 13, 1915 to elect a Mayor to a one-year term and six Aldermen on a two-year term, and two Aldermen for a one-year term, to sit on the thirty-first Calgary City Council. In addition, a Commissioner, four members for the Public School Board, three members for the Separate School Board, two plebiscites on daylight savings time and extension of coving franchise both passed.

The eight elected Aldermen joined Aldermen John Sidney Arnold, Arthur Walter Ellson Fawkes, James Abel Hornby, and Isaac Gideon Ruttle who were previously elected for two-year terms in 1914 on Calgary City Council.

Background
The election was held under multiple non-transferable vote where each elector was able to cast a ballot for the mayor, commissioner and six ballots for Aldermen who were elected at-large with the city as one large district.

Voting franchise was open to all men or women listed on the City's assessment roll with real property valued over $400. The 1915 election would be the last municipal election in Calgary requiring property ownership, and was the last without a citizenship requirement.

Two one-year Alderman position was opened on Council following John William Mitchell and John Leslie Jennison resigned during their two year term. The six candidates with the most votes were elected to two year terms, while the next two highest candidates were elected to a single year term.

Mayor Costello and Commissioner Graves were acclaimed upon the close of nominations on December 7, 1915.

Results

Mayor
Michael Copps Costello - Acclaimed

Commissioner
Arthur Garnet Graves - Acclaimed

Councillors

School board trustee

Public school board

Separate school board
John Burns - Acclaimed
John Edward McDonald - Acclaimed
James L. Tobin - Acclaimed

Plebiscite

Franchise extension
Extension of voting franchise to all residents male or female who are British subjects 21 years of age who have been residents of the city for six months prior to June 1 of the year of a municipal election.
For - 1,519
Against - 361

Daylight savings
Daylight savings time.
For - 1,334
Against - 1,007

See also
List of Calgary municipal elections

References

Politics of Calgary
Municipal elections in Calgary
1915 elections in Canada
1910s in Calgary